Les Sept Laux is a group of three winter sports resorts of the Alps located in the Belledonne (Isère) about  from Grenoble and  from Chambery on common Theys, Les Adrets and La Ferrière.

Les Sept Laux has two stations side valley of the Isère, (Prapoutel and Pipay) and one (Le Pleynet) on the other side of the massif.

External links 

  Les 7 Laux official site
  Prapoutel Tourism office site, on  grenoble-tourisme.com

Ski areas and resorts in France
Sports venues in Isère